Allastair Malcolm Cluny McReady-Diarmid VC (21 March 1888 – 1 December 1917) was a British recipient of the Victoria Cross, the highest and most prestigious award for gallantry in the face of the enemy that can be awarded to British and Commonwealth forces.

Details
He was 29 years old, and an Acting Captain in the 17th (S) Battalion, The Middlesex Regiment (Duke of Cambridge's Own), British Army during the First World War when the following deed took place for which he was awarded the VC.

On 30 November/1 December 1917 at the Moeuvres Sector, France, when the enemy penetrated into our position, and the situation was extremely critical, Captain McReady-Diarmid led his company through a heavy barrage and immediately engaged the enemy and drove them back at least 300 yards, causing numerous casualties and taking 27 prisoners. The following day the enemy again attacked and drove back another company which had lost all its officers. The captain called for volunteers, and leading the attack, again drove them back. It was entirely due to his throwing of bombs that the ground was regained, but he was eventually killed by a bomb.

He is commemorated on the Cambrai Memorial to the Missing.

Further information
As a boy, McReady-Diarmid went to Queen Elizabeth's Grammar School for Boys, Barnet, Hertfordshire. His Victoria Cross is displayed at the National Army Museum, Chelsea, England.

References

External links
The Middlesex Regiment 1755-1966 (detailed history of the original "Die Hards")

1888 births
1917 deaths
British World War I recipients of the Victoria Cross
Middlesex Regiment officers
British Army personnel of World War I
British military personnel killed in World War I
People educated at Victoria College, Jersey
People from Southgate, London
People educated at Queen Elizabeth's Grammar School for Boys
British Army recipients of the Victoria Cross
Military personnel from London